Mukwelle Madzey Akale (born January 18, 1997) is an American professional soccer player who plays as a winger for South Georgia Tormenta FC in USL League One.

Club career 
Akale joined the academy of Spanish side Villarreal after impressing playing for United States U18s in a youth tournament in the Canary Islands. In August 2020, Akale, alongside his younger brother, moved to Cypriot First Division side Pafos. On September 12, 2020, he made his professional debut for Pafos, as a half-time substitute in a 2–1 loss to Apollon Limassol.

Akale joined USL League One club South Georgia Tormenta on August 25, 2022.

International career 
Akale was born in the United States, and is of Cameroonian descent through his father. Akale has represented the United States at under-17, under-18 and under-20 level.

References

External links 

1997 births
Living people
Soccer players from Minnesota
Sportspeople from Minneapolis
American soccer players
American people of Cameroonian descent
Association football wingers
Segunda División B players
Tercera División players
Villarreal CF C players
Villarreal CF B players
Cypriot First Division players
Pafos FC players
American expatriate soccer players
American expatriate sportspeople in Spain
American expatriate sportspeople in Cyprus
Expatriate footballers in Spain
Expatriate footballers in Cyprus
Tormenta FC players